The Niš rebellion or was a short-lived Christian uprising (5–26 April 1841) that broke out in the Ottoman nahiya (sub-districts) of Niš, Pirot, Vranje and Toplica, today in Serbia. At that time, it was known as the Bulgarian revolt. In Serbian historiography it is regarded as a Serbian revolt, while in Bulgarian historiography as a Bulgarian rebellion.

Rebellion and suppression 
The rebellion was led by Miloje Jovanović and Nikoča Srndaković Srndak. It was rapid, large and forceful, relatively unexpected by the Ottomans with initial combat successes. Ali Riza, a special commissioner sent to negotiate with the rebels, in a report sent to Istanbul, referred to the Bulgarians who dared intending to achieve supposed independence like that of the Serbs. During the rebellion, the Ottomans burnt down 225 villages.

Aftermath 
After the suppression of the rebellion, protests against Ottoman rule continued until September 1842. Around 10,000 people fled to the Principality of Serbia and the Ottoman government appealed for their return. As a result, Miloš Obrenović I of Serbia took a hand in arranging it. Jérôme-Adolphe Blanqui wrote Voyage en Bulgarie (Voyage in Bulgaria), a report of a mission given by French authorities to investigate the real causes of the Niš revolt.

Notes

See also
 Battle of Čegar
 Niš conspiracy (1821)
 Bulgarians in Serbia

References

Sources

Недељковић, С. "Учешће Арбанаса у гушењу Нишке буне 1841. године. У: С. Недељковић (Прир.)." Устанци и побуне Срба у Турској у XIX векуповодом 170. година од избијања Нишке буне (2012): 7-24.
Tanzimat ve Sosyal Direnişler Niş İsyanı Üzerine Ayrıntılı Bir İnceleme (1841)

History of Niš
Vranje
Pirot District
Toplica District
1841 in the Ottoman Empire
1840s in Serbia
Serb rebellions against the Ottoman Empire
Bulgarian rebellions
Conflicts in 1841
19th-century rebellions
April 1841 events